Pan African Film Festival (PAFF) is a non-profit corporation in Los Angeles, California, United States, that states its goal is to promote "cultural understanding among peoples of African descent" through exhibiting art and film. It hosts a film festival and an arts festival in Los Angeles in February of each year. The Los Angeles Times in 2013 called the film festival "the largest black film festival" in the United States.

Background

In its early years, it was held in West Africa, specifically in Burkina Faso (in February 1985, it was held in Ouagadougou and hosted by Thomas Sankara).

The first official festival was organized in 1992 by actors Danny Glover and Ja'net Dubois and executive director Ayuko Babu. Glover and actress Whoopi Goldberg co-hosted the festival. The Los Angeles Times said the films had universal themes as well as African themes: "the overthrow of colonial governments, the clash between modern values and traditional values, and tales of gifted artists". Films at the first festival included Sarraounia, Heritage Africa, and Lord of the Street. The films included feature-length documentaries, short documentaries, narrative feature films, narrative short films, and web series.

See also

 Pan-Africanism
 List of film festivals

References

External links

African-American film festivals
African Americans in California
Film festivals in Los Angeles
Film festival
Film festivals established in 1992
Pan-Africanism in the Caribbean